Lamarckdromia is a genus of crabs within the family Dromiidae, containing 3 species. The most recent species described, Lamarckdromia beagle, was discovered in Australia after being washed onto a beach in 2022. Its species name beagle is in recognition of Charles Darwin’s ship HMS Beagle.

Species 

 Lamarckdromia beagle McLay & Hosie, 2022
 Lamarckdromia excavata (Stimpson, 1858)
 Lamarckdromia globosa (Lamarck, 1818)

References 

Dromiacea